The Episcopal Diocese of Ohio is a diocese of the Episcopal Church in the United States of America comprising the northern 48 counties of the state of Ohio. Established in 1818, it was the first diocese of the Episcopal Church to be established outside the original 13 colonies and presently consists of 95 parishes, with a membership of almost 19,000 individuals. The diocese was contiguous with the state of Ohio, but was divided into two dioceses in 1875, due to the geographical size of the diocese and the poor health of Bishops MacIlvaine and Bedell. The Episcopal Diocese of Ohio, which retained the original name, and the Diocese of Southern Ohio headquartered in Cincinnati. It is one of 15 dioceses that make up the Province of the Midwest (Province 5).

Originally the diocesan see, or headquarters city, was located in Gambier in south-central Ohio, but moved to Cleveland shortly after the diocesan split. Offices are located on Euclid Avenue near Trinity Cathedral, the cathedral of the diocese.

History
As settlers and missionaries moved westward after the Revolutionary War, they brought their faith traditions with them, including those of the newly formed Episcopal Church. In the Ohio Territory, three clergyman served as early missionaries. Efforts in the Ohio Valley were led by Deacon James Kilbourne and Joseph Doddridge, while Roger Searle led efforts in the Western Reserve. Shortly after Ohio was admitted to the Union, the first Episcopal church was established in the state at Worthington, near present-day Columbus in 1804. After years of fruitless petitions and through the hard work of missionaries and others, the General Convention of the Episcopal Church finally granted Ohio a separate diocese in 1818.

Philander Chase was appointed the first Bishop of Ohio in 1819. Chase returned from a fund raising trip to England in 1823 and established the diocesan headquarters and a new Episcopal college, Kenyon College, in Gambier. Kenyon College and Gambier were named for Lord Kenyon and Lord Gambier, the largest benefactors of the college and new diocese. Bishop Chase retired after a leadership dispute in 1832, and soon moved to Illinois.

Charles Pettit McIlvaine succeeded him as Ohio's bishop and Kenyon College's president. Rt.Rev. McIlvaine was a leading advocate of Evangelicalism, which called upon the Episcopal Church to turn from the more Anglo-catholic reforms of the Oxford Movement and return to a purer Protestant expression in the Church.

Upon Bishop McIlvaine's death in 1873, Gregory Thurston Bedell became the Third Bishop of Ohio, having been consecrated as assistant bishop in 1859. Bishop Bedell had staunchly supported the Union in the Civil War, and, like McIlvaine, has been credited with keeping the Episcopal Church unified during this time, unlike many other denominations. Two years later, the General Convention split the Diocese of Ohio into two separate dioceses. The Diocese of Ohio favored more evangelical expression of worship and theology, and Bishop Bedell moved its headquarters to Cleveland at its northeast corner, in the growing urban areas along Lake Erie. Thomas Augustus Jaggar was then consecrated the first bishop of the new Episcopal Diocese of Southern Ohio, which had some parishes favoring more Anglo-catholic styles and established its headquarters in Cincinnati in the state's southwestern corner.

William Andrew Leonard was consecrated as the Fourth Bishop of Ohio in 1889 and was responsible, with financial backing from William G. Mather, for constructing Trinity Cathedral, completed in 1907. Charles F. Schweinfurth designed the structure in English Perpendicular Gothic form from Indiana limestone. Diocesan offices were located in the adjoining Church House, where they remain.

Bishops

Current
The Right Reverend Mark Hollingsworth, Jr. was consecrated as the 11th Bishop of Ohio on April 17, 2004 and is assisted by two assisting bishops: the Right Reverend William Persell, retired bishop of the Diocese of Chicago; and the Right Reverend Arthur Williams, retired bishop suffragan of the Diocese of Ohio.

Former
Bishops who have served the diocese include:

 Philander Chase (1819-1832)
 Charles Pettit McIlvaine (1832-1873)
 Gregory T. Bedell (1873-1889)
 William Andrew Leonard (1889-1930)
 Warren Lincoln Rogers (1930-1938)
 Beverley D. Tucker (1938-1952)
 Nelson M. Burroughs (1952-1967)
 John Harris Burt (1967-1983)
 James R. Moodey (1983-1994)
 J. Clark Grew II (1994-2004)

Notes

External links
Official web site of the Diocese of Ohio
Trinity Cathedral
St. Timothy Episcopal Church
Journal of the Annual Convention, Diocese of Ohio

Ohio
Religious organizations established in 1819
Diocese of Ohio
Anglican dioceses established in the 19th century
Christianity in Cleveland
1819 establishments in Ohio
Province 5 of the Episcopal Church (United States)